General elections were held in Uruguay on 30 November 1958, alongside a constitutional referendum. Following the end of a schism between the National Party and the Independent National Party, the National Party received almost half the vote, winning a majority of seats in the National Council of Government, the Chamber of Deputies and the Senate, and allowing it to lead the government for the first time since 1865.

Results

References

Elections in Uruguay
1958 elections in South America
1958 in Uruguay
November 1958 events in South America
Election and referendum articles with incomplete results